Luciano Giovannetti (born 26 July 1934) is an Italian ordinary of the Catholic Church and the Bishop Emeritus of Fiesole. He is the current president of the John Paul II Foundation for Dialogue, Cooperation and Development.

Biography 
Luciano Giovannetti was born on 26 July 1934 in Civitella in Val di Chiana, a comune in the Tuscan province of Arezzo.

He was ordained a priest on 15 June 1957 in Arezzo and on 15 February 1978 was simultaneously the Auxiliary Bishop of Arezzo and the Titular Bishop of the Diocese of Zaba. He was consecrated a bishop on 8 April of that year. The principal consecrator was Telesforo Giovanni Cioli, the Bishop of Cortona, and the principal co-consecrators were Giuseppe Franciolini, Coadjutor Bishop of Arezzo, and Angelo Scapecchi, Titular Bishop of Vicohabentia.

On 27 May 1981, Giovannetti was appointed the Bishop of Fiesole and was installed on 6 September 1981, succeeding Simone Scatizzi. He acted as principal co-consecrator of Rodolfo Cetoloni in 2000. He assumed emeritus status on 13 February 2010 and was succeeded by Mario Meini.

Giovannetti is the current president of the John Paul II Foundation for Dialogue, Cooperation and Development. He is also the Grand Prior for Central Apennine of the Equestrian Order of the Holy Sepulchre of Jerusalem.

See also
Catholic Church in Italy

References

External links 

 Diocese of Fiesole

21st-century Italian Roman Catholic bishops
20th-century Italian Roman Catholic bishops
Living people
Bishops in Tuscany
People from Fiesole
People from the Province of Arezzo
1934 births